Debra Maybury (born 8 August 1971) is an English cricketer and former member of the England women's cricket team who played as a right-handed batter and right-arm medium bowler. She played 5 Test matches and 27 One Day Internationals between 1988 and 1995. She played domestic cricket for Yorkshire.

References

External links

1971 births
Living people
England women Test cricketers
England women One Day International cricketers
Yorkshire women cricketers
Cricketers from Huddersfield